Sullurupeta revenue division is an administrative division in the Tirupati district of the Indian state of Andhra Pradesh. It is one of the four revenue divisions in the district and comprises nine mandals. The division was part of Nellore district and was made a part of the newly formed Tirupati district on 4 April 2022.

Administration 
The revenue division comprises nine mandals: Buchinaidu Kandriga, Doravarisatram, Naidupeta, Ozili, Pellakur, Satyavedu, Sullurpeta, Tada and Varadaiahpalem.

See also 
List of revenue divisions in Andhra Pradesh
List of mandals in Andhra Pradesh
Tirupati district
Tirupati revenue division
Gudur revenue division
Srikalahasti revenue division

References 

Revenue divisions in Tirupati district
2022 establishments in Andhra Pradesh